Stepping Out is a 1931 American Pre-Code farce directed by Charles Reisner and produced and distributed by Metro-Goldwyn-Mayer. It is based on the 1929 Broadway play Stepping Out by Elmer Harris. Lilian Bond appeared in the original Broadway play and in this film in the same role.

Cast
Charlotte Greenwood - Sally Smith
Leila Hyams - Eve Martin
Reginald Denny - Tom Martin
Lilian Bond - Cleo Del Rio
Cliff Edwards - Paul Perkins
Merna Kennedy - Madge
Harry Stubbs- Tubby Smith
Richard Tucker - Charley Miller
Kane Richmond - Hal Rogers
Wilson Benge - Parker

References

External links
Stepping Out, imdb.com 
Stepping Out details, allmovie.com
Lobby posters, movieposterdb.com
Stepping Out available on DVD from WarnerArchives/WBShop website, wbshop.com

1931 films
Films directed by Charles Reisner
American films based on plays
Metro-Goldwyn-Mayer films
American comedy films
1931 comedy films
American black-and-white films
1930s American films